Gustaf Lucander, also Locander (1724–1805) was a Finnish painter.

Lucander was born in Turku, and primarily painted religious-themed works for church commissions. He started off as a secular decoration artist. He painted altarpieces for the church in Nötö (1771) and Piikkiö (1776). He worked on restoring an altar for a church in Huittinen following a fire, which was so thorough that the board can even be seen in his painting.

References

1724 births
1805 deaths
Finnish male painters
People from Turku
18th-century Finnish painters
18th-century male artists
19th-century Finnish painters
19th-century Finnish male artists